Charles Idus Bradshaw (December 31, 1923 – June 3, 1999) was an American college football player and coach. He served as the head football coach at the University of Kentucky from 1962 to 1968 and Troy State University—now know as Troy University—from 1976 to 1982, compiling a career head caoching record of 66–68–6.

Coaching career
Bradshaw was an assistant coach at the University of Alabama under Bear Bryant and was on the staff that won the 1961 national championship.

At Kentucky Bradshaw inherited a program that had won a championship in 1950 under Bear Bryant and had been moderately well-regarded under Blanton Collier but posted a record of 25–41–4 (.386) in its previous seven seasons. Bradshaw's 1964 team was ranked #5 in the AP Poll after defeating #1 ranked Ole Miss on the road, 27–21, and beating Auburn, 20–0, for a 3–0 start, but the squad finished 5–5 after defeating Tennessee in its final game. Bradshaw's 1965 team defeated #10 Georgia, 28–10, and appeared bound for a bowl game, being ranked in the AP top ten for four weeks in September and November of that season. Bradshaw's wins in 1965 included games at Missouri, which capped the season with a Sugar Bowl victory and #6 national ranking in the final AP Poll, an upset of another bowl-bound team from Ole Miss, and another win over Georgia. The 1965 team was then set back when star quarterback Rick Norton suffered a broken leg. The Wildcats finished 6–4 and out of bowl contention. The remainder of Bradshaw's tenure at Kentucky was disappointing, although his final team did defeat a Missouri team that ended up winning the Gator Bowl and earning a #9 national ranking in the final AP Poll. The 1968 Kentucky team also defeated a ranked Oregon State team. Tackle Herschel Turner, tackle Sam Ball, halfback Rodger Bird, and quarterback Rick Norton were named first-team All Americans under Bradshaw at Kentucky.

Bradshaw was the coach in 1962 of the infamous Thin Thirty at Kentucky, the team going from 88 players when Bradshaw arrived in January of that year to just 30 by the end of the year. That season was profiled in Sports Illustrated and in a book published in August 2007, The Thin Thirty, by Shannon Ragland.

Bradshaw also helped recruit Nate Northington, who became the first scholarship African-American athlete to play in an SEC game when Kentucky faced Ole Miss on September 30, 1967.

Bradshaw was the last Kentucky coach to defeat a #1 ranked team until Rich Brooks led the Wildcats to a victory over #1 ranked LSU in 2007.  He was also the last Kentucky head coach to defeat the University of Tennessee twice in Knoxville, and the last Kentucky coach to post two wins against Auburn University.

Head coaching record

References

1923 births
1999 deaths
Alabama Crimson Tide football coaches
Kentucky Wildcats football coaches
Kentucky Wildcats football players
Texas A&M Aggies football coaches
Troy Trojans football coaches
Vanderbilt Commodores football coaches
United States Marine Corps personnel of World War II
United States Marines
People from Clio, Alabama
Players of American football from Montgomery, Alabama